Paul Gavin Williams (born 16 January 1968) is a Church of England bishop. Since May 2015, he has been the Bishop of Southwell and Nottingham; from 2009 to 2015, he was the Bishop of Kensington, an area bishop in the Diocese of London.

Early life
Paul Williams was born to Bryan and Heather Williams on 16 January 1968 in Weston-super-Mare, Somerset, England. He was educated in Somerset at Court Fields School, a comprehensive school in Wellington, and at Richard Huish College, a sixth-form college in Taunton. He studied theology at Grey College, Durham, graduating with a Bachelor of Arts (BA) degree in 1989. He trained for ordination at Wycliffe Hall, Oxford, an evangelical Anglican theological college. Paul Williams’s mother, Heather, was one of the first women to be ordained priest at Wells Cathedral in 1994. His father was an electrical engineer.

Ordained ministry
Paul Williams was ordained a deacon at Petertide on 28 June 1992 by David Hope, Bishop of London, at St Paul's Cathedral and ordained a priest in 1993. He was a curate at St James with St Matthew's Muswell Hill (1992–1995) and then Associate Vicar at Christ Church, Clifton in Bristol (1995–1999) before becoming the rector of St James's Gerrards Cross with Fulmer (1999–2009). During this time the church saw considerable growth, with six Sunday services spanning contemporary to traditional choral; also a pioneering children’s ministry with creative arts. Paul Williams was an honorary canon of Christ Church, Oxford from 2007-09.

Episcopal ministry
Paul Williams was ordained (consecrated) to the episcopate on 25 March 2009 by Rowan Williams, Archbishop of Canterbury, at St Paul's Cathedral, London. From 2009 to 2015, he was the Bishop of Kensington, an area bishop in the Diocese of London. Alongside his oversight of 130 churches in West London he also had diocesan responsibility for ministry training and leadership development. On 11 May 2015, Paul Williams' canonical election as Bishop of Southwell and Nottingham was confirmed. He was installed as diocesan bishop during an inauguration service on 27 June 2015 at Southwell Minster. He became a member of the House of Lords upon his introduction (as a Lord Spiritual) on 13 June 2022.

Views
In 2023, following the news that the House of Bishop's of the Church of England was to introduce proposals for blessing same-sex relationships, he signed an open letter which stated:

Personal life
Paul married Sarah (nee Cossham) at Christ Church, Clifton in February 1997; they have three sons.

Styles
The Reverend Paul Williams (1993–2007)
The Reverend Canon Paul Williams (2007–2009)
The Right Reverend Paul Williams (2009–present)

References

1968 births
Alumni of Grey College, Durham
21st-century Church of England bishops
Living people
Bishops of Kensington
Bishops of Southwell
Lords Spiritual
Alumni of Wycliffe Hall, Oxford